Proxhyle vadoni is a moth in the family Erebidae. It was described by Hervé de Toulgoët in 1953. It is found on Madagascar.

References

Toulgoët, H. de (1954). "Description d'Arctiidae nouveaux de Madagascar (Lep.)". Mémoires de l'Institut scientifique de Madagascar. (E) 4 (1953): 345–359.

Moths described in 1953
Lithosiini